École secondaire Le Caron is the only French first language high school located in Penetanguishene, Ontario, Canada. It serves the French population of Simcoe County, and it is managed by Conseil scolaire Viamonde.

Early history
Since 1976, the Simcoe County School Board has been deaf to the demands of Francophones regarding the creation of a school.

The tone rose sharply in September 1979, a few months before the referendum on sovereignty in Quebec, when French speakers in the Penetanguishene region opened the École secondaire de la Huronie, a parallel and illegal school. This "school of resistance" included 54 students from grades 9 to 13. This school only existed for one year, but became the symbol of the struggle for the flourishing of Franco-Ontarian culture. 

The dispute culminated in a legal battle that ended in two stages. First, in 1980, when an agreement in principle with the province and the school board led to a school. Built between 1980 and 1981, Le Caron secondary school could finally open on April 23, 1982.  At the same time, in July 1986, the Ontario Superior Court ruled in favor of Jacques Marchand in his 1984 lawsuit against the province and the school board, culminating in the Sirois judgment. The ruling forced Ontario to invest $ 5.7 million to expand the Le Caron School so that it could offer services equivalent to those provided to the English-speaking majority.

For more information on the history of the Franco-Ontario crisis in the region, visit the "Penetanguishene and The School of Resistance" pages of the virtual exhibition "Présence française en Ontario: 1610, passeport pour 2010", on the University Of Ottawa website: Centre de recherche en civilisation canadienne-française (CRCCF)

Recent history
Over the years the school has moved from its original building on Main Street to 22 John Street, where it currently resides. Throughout the years it has maintained its proud Franco-Ontarian heritage by participating in local French events and charities. Le Caron hosts grades 7 to 12 exclusively in French while maintaining the provincial education standards set forth by the province of Ontario. On average, 150 students are counted annually; all from the surrounding Franco-Ontarian region. On May 20–22, the school will be celebrating 40 since its inception as the only French-first High school of Ontario.

Curriculum
As outlined in the Sirois Judgment, Ecole Secondaire Le Caron offers many courses also available in other area English high schools which include the following:
auto mechanic
welding
woodworking/Construction
Spanish
civics (cooking/basic accounting)
comprehensive CO-OP program

A detailed list of available courses can be acquired by contacting the CSViamond school board site.

Extracurricular
Ecole Secondaire Le Caron has many extra curricular activities which students can participate including: Volleyball, Basketball, Hockey, Orchestra, Jazz band and Improv. The sports teams regularly make their way to the SCAA, OFSAA and GBSSA finals and their orchestra/band hosts events throughout the year. 

 2019, Senior Girls Volleyball team won the SCAA championships
 2018, Junior Girls Volleyball team won the GBSSA championships
 2018, Junior Boys Hockey Team won the Franco/stars Tournament

Notable students
Damien Robitaille, Franco-Ontarian Musician
Eric Dubeau, Franco-Ontarian Musician

External links 
 http://lecaron.csviamonde.ca
 http://csviamonde.ca
 https://www.facebook.com/ESLeCaron/
 http://www.huronie.com/historique.htm huronie.com/historique.htm 
 https://onfr.tfo.org/penetanguishene-une-exposition-permanente-pour-le-40e-anniversaire-de-lecole-de-la-resistance/

High schools in Simcoe County
French-language high schools in Ontario
Educational institutions established in 1979
1979 establishments in Ontario
Franco-Ontarian history